P&R may refer to:

 P&R Publishing, Christian publishers
 Park and ride, car parks with connections to public transport
 Parks and Recreation, an American television comedy series
 Pastrami and rye, a popular sandwich combination
 Place and route